"Tony Blair" is a single by Chumbawamba which was made available exclusively to the United Kingdom mailing list as a Christmas present in December 1999.

Background 
Chumbawamba had long been critical of the administration of British Prime Minister Tony Blair and his New Labour Party, with Blair's "alleged perfidy" among the topics of their 1997 breakout album, Tubthumper. At the 1998 Brit Awards, band member Danbert Nobacon leaned into the face of the Prime Minister's wife, Cherie Blair, to sing the line "New Labour have sold out the dockers", and later at the show threw water in the face of deputy Prime Minister John Prescott as revenge for his resisting calls to recognize the Liverpool dock workers' strike. Group vocalist Alice Nutter later revealed that the band had hoped that Blair himself would be present at the awards show, telling the Mirror that "We hate the Labour Party […] because they've sold out. They're rubbish. We hoped Tony Blair would be [at the awards show] so we could all go up and spit in his bubbly."

Composition and lyrics 
The Guardian described the song as a "retro tale of puppy love with a double-crossing dreamboat". Its lyrics include "Tony, now you date/All the girls that you used to hate/So I don't believe a single word you say."

Single art 
The cover art pays tribute to the iconic artwork of Elvis Presley's debut album, which was also referenced by The Clash's London Calling album cover.

Backlash 
Rupert Perry, the head of EMI Records UK at the time, was reportedly very displeased with the band for issuing the single, and sent them a letter which included the statement "I actually think Tony is really fab". All copies of the CD in EMI offices were later confiscated. The song can be downloaded in mp3 format from the band's website.

Track listing

References

Chumbawamba songs
1999 singles
Cultural depictions of Tony Blair
1999 songs
Songs against capitalism
Songs about prime ministers of the United Kingdom
Protest songs
Doo-wop songs